Ion Ustian (born 12 September 1939, in Olișcani) is a Moldavian politician.

Biography 
Ion Ustian was born on 12 September 1939 in Olișcani, Șoldănești District. 

Ion Ustian was the prime minister of Moldavian SSR (30 December 1980 – 24 December 1985). 

Later that year, he was wounded in a car accident, but made a quick recovery.

Works
 Laureații Premiului Nobel în economie (Editura Știința, Chișinău, 1999)
 Omul produce scopuri... : Eminescu și economia teoretică (Ed. Cartea Moldovei, Chișinău, 2000)
 Пушкин и политэкономия (Кишинев, 2002)

 

1939 births
Living people
People from Șoldănești District
Communist Party of the Soviet Union members
Moldovan communists
Prime Ministers of Moldova
Foreign ministers of Moldova
Moldovan economists